This list of tallest buildings in Indonesia ranks skyscrapers in Indonesia by height. There are 88 high-rise buildings (150m+) in Jakarta (the capital city of Indonesia) and its greater areas, and 26 more under construction. Indonesia is ranked 11th in the world by the number of 150m+ completed buildings and 9th in Asia. There are four supertall buildings (300m+) under construction. The average building age is eight years. The first high-rise in Jakarta was Wisma 46 (262 m), which holds the longest record, of 20 years, as the highest building in Jakarta. The tallest building in Jakarta is Autograph Tower (383 m) since 2022.

Tallest buildings
Buildings listed here are completed and at least 200 meters in height.

Tallest under construction and proposed

Under construction 

This lists buildings that are under construction in Indonesia and are planned to have a height of at least 200 meters.

Proposed 
Since there are too many proposed buildings in Indonesia, only major supertalls are shown:

See also

List of tallest buildings in Jakarta
List of tallest buildings in Batam
List of tallest buildings in Surabaya
List of tallest buildings in Medan
List of tallest structures in Indonesia

References

External links
 Diagram of Jakarta skyscrapers on SkyscraperPage

Tallest

Indonesia
Indonesia